is a Japanese long-distance runner. She competed in the 10,000 metres at the 2015 World Championships in Beijing placing 22nd.

International competitions

Personal bests
Outdoor
1500 metres – 4:19.16 (Okayama 2008)
3000 metres – 9:13.84 (Okayama 2009)
5000 metres – 15:40.60 (Yamaguchi 2011)
10,000 metres – 31:48.31 (Abashiri 2015)
10 kilometres – 32:39 (Okayama 2015)
15 kilometres – 48:46 (Okayama 2015)
20 kilometres – 1:05:38 (Okayama 2015)
Half marathon – 1:09:17 (Okayama 2015)
25 kilometres – 1:25:15 (Nagoya 2015)
Marathon – 2:23:20 (Nagoya 2016)

References

Japanese female long-distance runners
Living people
People from Kurashiki
Sportspeople from Okayama Prefecture
1990 births
World Athletics Championships athletes for Japan
20th-century Japanese women
21st-century Japanese women